Iroquois is a neighborhood on the south side of Louisville, Kentucky, United States. It is split into two parts by Beechmont. From a historical perspective, the northwestern section would be the Bryn Mawr neighborhood and the southeastern section would be the Kenwood neighborhood. The Iroquois neighborhood is roughly bounded by Hazelwood Avenue, Beechmont, Third Street, Kenwood Drive, and Iroquois Park. Located near the Louisville International Airport, residents have frequently complained of noise and challenged airport expansion. The largely residential neighborhood was developed as a suburb after World War II and into the 1950s. 

The notorious Iroquois Tenement Housing Complex was torn down in 2012 and replaced with the Hope Garden Project, an urban farming collaboration involving KentuckyOne Health, the Food Literacy Project and the Metro Housing Authority. 

Iroquois has a lending library, a branch of the Louisville Free Public Library.

Notable residents include musician Bryson Tiller.

See also
Kenwood Hill, Louisville
Colonial Gardens

References

External links
Street map of Iroquois neighborhood
Images of Iroquois (Louisville, Ky.) in the University of Louisville Libraries Digital Collections
Population of Iroquois, Louisville, Kentucky published on StatisticalAtlas.com Demographic information by neighborhood, compiled and aggregated from the 2010 census and from the 2012-2016 American Community Survey

Neighborhoods in Louisville, Kentucky
1940s establishments in Kentucky
Populated places established in the 1940s